Juliette is an unincorporated community and census-designated place (CDP) in Monroe County, Georgia, United States.  The community is part of the Macon Metropolitan Statistical Area. Named for Juliette McCracken, daughter of a railroad engineer, the town formed with the merging of Brownsville and Iceberg. The film Fried Green Tomatoes was filmed there, and the town has been the focal point of three popular Southern humor books. After the filming of Fried Green Tomatoes, the sets used for the town's main street were renovated into a tourist district, complete with a fully operational "Whistle Stop Cafe".

Other movie productions set in Juliette were Cockfighter (1974) starring Warren Oates, A Killing Affair (1986) starring Peter Weller, The Tuskegee Airmen (1995) and the documentary Fried Green Tomorrows: Juliette, Ga. Lives (2006) directed by Neill Calabro and starring Danny Vinson.  A small cafe scene set in Juliette in The War (1994) with Kevin Costner also displayed the Juliette Volunteer Fire Department.

It was first listed as a CDP in the 2020 census with a population of 290.

Geography
Juliette is in northeastern Monroe County, on the west bank of the Ocmulgee River, which forms the Monroe–Jones County line. U.S. Route 23 passes through the west side of the community, leading southeast  to Macon and northwest  to Jackson. Round Oak Juliette Road crosses the Ocmulgee at Juliette and leads east  to Round Oak.

Demographics

2020 census

Note: the US Census treats Hispanic/Latino as an ethnic category. This table excludes Latinos from the racial categories and assigns them to a separate category. Hispanics/Latinos can be of any race.

Places and events of interest 
Less than 10 miles outside of Juliette is the Jarrell Plantation, historical site on the U.S. National Register of Historic Places with a museum and a park.

Juliette is also home to Plant Scherer, one of the nation's largest power generation facilities.

On February 14 of each year, the town of Juliette offers a special dual postmark with the village of Romeo, Michigan. This tradition began in 1994, as a nod to the William Shakespeare play, Romeo and Juliet.

References

External links 
 Round America Travel Guide Information and Photos

Census-designated places in Monroe County, Georgia
Macon metropolitan area, Georgia